Ceratobairdia is an extinct genus of ostracod (seed shrimp) belonging to the order Podocopida and family Bairdiidae. Specimens have been found in Permian to Jurassic beds in North America, China, and Europe.

The genus is heavily ornamented, and a distinctive characteristic is that its valves (shells) have a flat ventral surface and a ventrolateral alate ridge (a winglike ridge extending from the ventral surface to the side of the valve.) The genus is also notable as a Lazarus taxon, disappearing in the Permian-Triassic extinction event and reappearing in the Carnian, an interval of at least 15 million years.

Species 
C. ambigua Ishizaki 1964
C. dorsospinosa Sohn 1954
 C. sinensis Wang 1978
 C. triassica Bolz 1971
C. venterocostata Wang 1978
C. xiaobaensis Xie 1989

References 

Paleozoic life
Ostracods
Prehistoric ostracod genera